Yadaly Diaby (born 9 August 2000) is a French professional footballer who plays as a midfielder for Austrian club Austria Lustenau on loan from the  club Clermont.

Club career 
Yadaly Diaby started playing football at Andrézieux-Bouthéon in 2013, where he played several seasons in the Championnat National 2 with their senior team; before joining Clermont on the summer 2021.

First playing with the reserve team in National 3, his performance—most notably a hat trick against during a 4-1 win against the Académie Moulins—quickly granted him an access to the first team, as he signed his first professional contract with the Auvergnats early November 2021.

Diaby made his professional debut for Clermont Foot on 1 December 2021, replacing an injured Jim Allevinah at the 63rd minute of a 2–2 home Ligue 1 draw against Lens. Whilst he saw hist team equalize just after he came on – as Mohamed Bayo scored the last goal of the game –, Diaby was red carded at the 84th, after he accidentally kicked an opponent. This exclusion earned him a 2 rounds ban from the French competition.

Style of play 
An offensively-minded midfielder, Diaby is able to play both as a left or a right midfielder.

Personal life 
Yadaly Diaby is a French footballer with Guinean origins.

Notes

References

External links

Clermont Foot profile

2000 births
Black French sportspeople
French sportspeople of Guinean descent
Living people
French footballers
Association football midfielders
Andrézieux-Bouthéon FC players
Clermont Foot players
SC Austria Lustenau players
Championnat National 2 players
Championnat National 3 players
Ligue 1 players
Austrian Football Bundesliga players
French expatriate footballers
Expatriate footballers in Austria
French expatriate sportspeople in Austria